Digger is a nickname for:

 John Barnes (footballer) (born 1963), Jamaican-born English former footballer and manager
 Arthur Brown (footballer, born 1859) (1859–1909), English footballer
 Duane G. Carey (born 1957), former NASA astronaut and retired US Air Force lieutenant colonel
 Al Cervi (1917–2009), American National Basketball League and National Basketball Association player and coach
 Digger Dawson (1905–?), English footballer
 Dale DeGray (born 1963), former National Hockey League player
 Paul Diggin (born 1985), English rugby union player
 William James (general) (1930–2015), Australian Army major general
 Digger Kettle (1922–1999), English footballer
 Peter Martin (cricketer) (born 1968), English former cricketer
 Rupert Murdoch, media baron, so named by Private Eye
 Billy O'Dell (born 1833), former Major League Baseball pitcher
 Ken Phelps (born 1954), former Major League Baseball player
 Digger Phelps (born 1941), American basketball coach and sportscaster
 Digger Robertson (William Robertson, 1861–1938), Australian cricketer
 Digger Stanley (1876–1919), English boxer
 William "Digger" Thomas (1890–1953), Australian rules footballer

Fictional characters
 Willard "Digger" Barnes, a character from the TV series, Dallas

See also 

 
 

Lists of people by nickname